Rick Kirby (born 1952) is an English sculptor born in Gillingham, Kent. He started his career as an art teacher, before quitting after sixteen years to focus on his work. Much of his work is figural, reflecting an interest in the human face and form, and is primarily in steel, which he describes as giving a scale and "whoom-factor" not possible with other media.

Early life and education
Kirby was born in 1952 into a naval family. He was interested in art as a child, and went on to study it after high school. From 1969 to 1970 he studied at the Somerset College of Art, and from 1970 to 1973 at the Newport College Of Art, from which he received a Bachelor of Fine Arts. This education was both liberating and confusing, he said, and left him without an idea for the direction of his work. From 1973 to 1974 he therefore studied towards an Art Teacher's Diploma at the University of Birmingham, and spent the next sixteen years teaching art.

During his time as a teacher Kirby's own artistic sense bent towards sculpture, and after sixteen years he quit teaching to focus on his work. For the next three years he sculpted in stone, before a steel-working co-tenant asked him to try out his welder. "Steel released me", Kirby said. "It gave me the ability to go huge, a scale that just is not possible with stone": a "whoom-factor!" As he described it, "it is the juxtaposition of steel in its raw form, cold-industrial, and the warm-human that my art breathes into it – that is my fascination."

Work
Kirby's oeuvre is largely figural, reflecting a fascination with the human face and form that has persisted since his time working in stone. Though he uses an industrial medium in steel, Kirby's pieces are intended to express elegance and grace, and guardianship; a reviewer of one of his exhibitions noted that "they do not dominate their settings, but instead calmly watch over their environment with an air of gentle theatricality."

Most of Kirby's pieces are public commissions, and are therefore monumental in size.

Several of Kirby's pieces are displayed in the Palace of Westminster in London, and in Putney along the banks of the River Thames.  His works have been unveiled by Queen Elizabeth II, Princess Margaret, and Prince Edward. When unveiling When the Sky's the Limit the Spirits Soar in 2005, Prince Edward remarked that "I don't know quite what the word is. It seems to represent something going upwards."

Notable commissions

Crouching Lady in Bardon Mill, 1997
The Ring of Hope in the Gardens of Gaia, 1997
Figure in Middle of Lake in the Gardens of Gaia, 1997
Public sculpture in Castlemilk, Glasgow, as part of the district's Gateways and Landmarks project in 1999 (Kirby's first Bronze)
Cross the Divide at the Main Entrance of St Thomas' Hospital, London, 2000
Sutton Hoo Helmet (pictured at right), Sutton Hoo exhibition hall, Suffolk, 2002
Arc of Angels at Portishead, 2002, commemorating Portishead Radio Station
Formation (pictured above) in Ravenswood, Ipswich, 2003
Spiral Formation for South Woodham Ferrers Leisure Centre swimming pool, 2005
When the Sky's the Limit the Spirits Soar, 2005
The Face at Wigan, 2008
Reflections of Bedford, Silver Street, Bedford, 2009
Crouching Figure, Oakley Court Hotel, Windsor, 2012
Hands, Woodbridge Quay Church, Suffolk, 2016
20th Century Head with others in the sculpture garden at Burghley House, Stamford

References

Bibliography

External links
 Glasgow, City of Sculpture 	
 Julia Stubbs, an  Advanced Skills Teacher in Art & Design at William de Ferrers School, Essex.
 Montcoffer (archived from the original)

1952 births
Living people
English sculptors
English male sculptors
People from Gillingham, Kent